Luke Barnaby Kurt Hollman (born 16 September 2000) is an English cricketer.

He made his Twenty20 debut on 1 September 2020, for Middlesex in the 2020 t20 Blast. Prior to his T20 debut, he was a member of the England squad for the 2018 Under-19 Cricket World Cup. He made his first-class debut on 22 April 2021, for Middlesex against Surrey in the 2021 County Championship. He made his List A debut on 25 July 2021, for Middlesex in the 2021 Royal London One-Day Cup. In September 2021, in the 2021 County Championship, Hollman took his maiden five-wicket haul in first-class cricket.

References

External links
 

2000 births
Living people
English cricketers
Middlesex cricketers
People from the London Borough of Islington